Parantaka was a name adopted by a number of South Indian kings. It may refer to:

 Parantaka I (907–950), Chola king
 Parantaka II (957–970), Chola king
 Jatila Parantaka Nedunjadayan (765–815), Pandyan king
 Parantaka Viranarayanan (880–905), Pandyan king